Allium hookeri is a plant species native to India, Sri Lanka, Myanmar (Burma), Bhutan, and southwestern China (Sichuan, Tibet and Yunnan). Common names include Hooker chives and garlic chives. The plant is widely cultivated outside its native range, and valued as a food item in much of South and Southeast Asia.

Allium hookeri produces thick, fleshy roots and a cluster of thin bulbs. Scapes are up top 60 cm tall. Leaves are flat and narrow, about the same length as the scapes but only 1 cm across. Umbels are crowded with many white or greenish-yellow flowers.

Uses
Allium hookeri is widely cultivated outside its native range, and valued as a food item in much of South and Southeast Asia.

References

External links
 

hookeri
Onions
Flora of tropical Asia
Edible plants
Plants described in 1937
Flora of China